PMX refers to the technology developed by Pelmorex to generate local weather information on The Weather Network. PMX consists of computers, typically installed at a cable headend, that takes data fed to it (the video feed of The Weather Network, forecast information, and triggers to run said forecasts) and packages it for broadcast. Unlike the Weather Star systems, it does not generate full graphical or video segments, rather the information is super-imposed over the main video feed. There are 4 different PMX units: PMX-1500, PMX-3200, PMX-NG and PMX-XD.

History
PMX was developed by Pelmorex in 1995 as a standard localization system that would replace the units and the text based that were still used in smaller communities. The PMX technology quickly rolled out starting 1996, with all communities receiving the new units by the end of 1997. Note: PMX generates local weather information to over 1200 communities across Alberta.

Timeline

1996-1998: PMX-1500 units are gradually deployed at major cable head-ends locations across Canada. They were originally formatted as a replica of the previous WeatherSTAR units, only with a slightly different icon and font set. The earliest known date of a PMX unit working is March 28, 1996, from Timmins, ON.
December 1997: Format changes occur with PMX-1500 system. Notable changes include, extended forecasts for the next 5 days, and national forecast maps immediately following the Local Forecast. The maps were discontinued one year later.
April 1999: Topographical Satellite and Radar Maps are introduced, replacing the solid color maps previously used.
August 2001: The PMX-1500 receives minor graphical updates, including an updated font set and fade effects in various segments.
Winter 2001: New icons are introduced to the PMX-1500 system. The 7-day outlook and the short-term precipitation forecast is also introduced.
July 2002: The classic current weather conditions ticker is replaced with a bar containing both current conditions and forecasts at a glance.
Severe weather warnings (specifically during Severe Thunderstorm, or Tornado Warnings) are displayed as a red bar with text at the bottom of the screen. Less severe weather warnings are displayed as a red full page overlay with text during the first part of the Local Forecast.

April 2004: The 14-day trend is introduced to the PMX-1500 system.
August 2004: PMX-1500 improves its coverage, providing more localized weather forecasts for up to 1200 communities.
April 2006: The hourly forecast is introduced, extending the Local Forecast by 15 seconds.
December 2008: An extended precipitation forecast is added to the Local Forecast. The ending feature on segments still ahead is discontinued.
November 2009: Animated Satellite/Radar maps are introduced to the Local Forecasts for the first time. Precipitation maps as well show types of precipitation (Rain, Ice, Snow)
June 2010: The Weather Network expands its network as they have announced going HD, which also means replacing and adding new PMX units. 
December 2010: The icon set receives a minor update to coincide with their re-branding. Modifications to the moon, thunderstorm and drizzle icons were most noticeable.
December 2011: A regional conditions page, almanac, local points of interest page and "Your Weather" pictures added to the local forecast extending it to a running length 3 minutes. The classic moon phases page is discontinued.
December 2012: The external Highway Conditions and Ski Conditions segments are discontinued and one local page for each is added to the local forecast.
July 2013: Major overhaul of the local forecast layout. Titles added to each page in top right corner above city name, and the 4x2 grid on the 7 day outlook is replaced with a 7 column table.
December 2013: The Local Forecast is split into 2 different lineups. One focuses on the short term forecast, including a new 36-hour forecast, and one that focuses on long term information. This would be discontinued in March 2014. Points of Interest is discontinued.
2014: PMX-3200 is released and gradually rolls out across the country. The new system includes a tidier font set and slightly modified weather icons.
2016: A new update was release to have a long term 20 day forecast and a new modern layout.
2016: PMX-NG is released
2020-2022: PMX-XD is released and implemented, replacing PMX-NG, PMX-3200 and PMX-1500 units.

Products
PMX is primarily used on segments that involve local weather information, notably during regular Local forecasts. Over the years PMX has been used for local tagging with advertisements, usually with listings of local dealers, and with "weather-triggered" advertising.

PMX units at major satellite TV providers display forecasts for a list of major Canadian centres. How smaller satellite providers in certain regions? (e.g. Saskatchewan) use customized PMX units that cover its geographical area. Conditions are shown for multiple cities at one time and box areas intended for different forecast products on normal PMX systems are repurposed: the 4x2 grid used for the 7-Day Outlook displays precipitation forecasts for the next 24 hours for 14 cities in Saskatchewan.

The technology has also been used for the MTS TV Weather Channel in Alberta.

PMX would be used to display warnings and alerts with the proposed "All Channel Alert" system.

References

1996 introductions
1996 establishments in Canada
Television technology
Pelmorex
Cable television in Canada